Song of Love may refer to:

 Song of love or love song, a song about falling in love
 The Song of Love (1923 film)
 Song of Love (1929 film), a film starring Belle Baker and Ralph Graves
 The Song of Love (1930 film)
 Song of Love (1947 film), a film starring Katharine Hepburn and Paul Henreid
 A Song of Love  (Un chant d'amour), a 1950 film by Jean Genet
 The Song of Love, a painting by Giorgio de Chirico
 "Song of Love" (song), a song by Paul McCartney
 "Song of Love", a song by Do As Infinity from True Song

See also 
 Love Song (disambiguation)
 Love Songs (disambiguation)
 Ai no Uta (disambiguation)